Valentina Raposo   (born 28 January 2003, Salta) is an Argentine field hockey player. She plays with the Argentina national field hockey team, winning silver medal at the 2020 Summer Olympics.

Hockey career 
In 2021, Raposo was called into the senior national women's team. She was the youngest player on the Argentina national team.

References

External links 
 Valentina Raposo Ruiz de los Llanos Eurosport
 

Argentine female field hockey players
Living people
2003 births
People from Salta
Field hockey players at the 2020 Summer Olympics
Olympic field hockey players of Argentina
Olympic silver medalists for Argentina
Medalists at the 2020 Summer Olympics
Olympic medalists in field hockey
Sportspeople from Salta Province